Dogue is an unincorporated community in King George County, Virginia, in the United States. Its name comes from the Doeg tribe that once inhabited the region.

Notable people
 John J. Ballentine, US Navy Admiral

References

Unincorporated communities in Virginia
Unincorporated communities in King George County, Virginia